Gianna Maria Canale (12 September 1927 – 13 February 2009) was an Italian film actress.

Biography 
Canale was born in 1927 in Reggio Calabria. In 1947, she competed in the Miss Italia beauty contest, where she was runner-up to Lucia Bosè. Following this, she appeared in many Italian magazines, with her looks being compared to those of Ava Gardner.

Canale was offered a role in a movie by Riccardo Freda, with whom she eventually fell in love. They moved to Brazil where they were married and worked together in two movies. As Canale did not enjoy living in South America, the couple returned to Italy where, often directed by her husband, she starred in many sword and hood movies, as well as horror and adventure ones. I vampiri was her last film with Freda.

Canale retired from acting in 1964 at the age of 37. She died in Sutri, Viterbo in January 2009.

Filmography

External links

Gianna Maria Canale at MSN Movies

1927 births
2009 deaths
People from Calabria
People from Reggio Calabria
Italian film actresses
20th-century Italian actresses